Trigonostemon cherrieri is a species of plant in the family Euphorbiaceae. It is endemic to New Caledonia.

References 

Crotonoideae
Endemic flora of New Caledonia
Critically endangered plants
Taxonomy articles created by Polbot